Elizabeth Harrower may refer to:
 Elizabeth Harrower (actress) (1918–2003), American actress and screenwriter
 Elizabeth Harrower (writer) (1928–2020), Australian novelist and short story writer